András Horváth (born 6 August 1980) is a former Hungarian professional footballer who played as a midfielder.

Career
Born in Szombathely, Horváth started his career in 1995 with local side Szombathelyi Haladás VSE, before joining FC Sopron in 2002. In 2006, he marked his debut with the Hungarian national team, and scored his first international goal in a friendly match against Austria on 16 August 2007. In August 2007 he was signed by Italian third-tier side Gallipoli on advice by Dario Bonetti, who coached him during his stay at FC Sopron. Eventually, he played for Zalaegerszeg, Haladás and Soproni VSE in Hungary.

Honours
FC Sopron
Hungarian Cup: 2005

International goals

References

External links
 

1980 births
Living people
Sportspeople from Szombathely
Hungarian footballers
Association football midfielders
Hungary international footballers
Szombathelyi Haladás footballers
FC Sopron players
A.S.D. Gallipoli Football 1909 players
Zalaegerszegi TE players
Soproni VSE players
Nemzeti Bajnokság I players
Hungarian expatriate footballers
Expatriate footballers in Italy
Hungarian expatriate sportspeople in Italy